Jyotica Tangri is an Indian playback singer. She debuted with "Phir Bhi Tumko Chaahungi" in Half Girlfriend, her version was not included in the film, eventually Shraddha Kapoor's version became a hit. She has sung for films like Behen Hogi Teri (2017), Shaadi Mein Zaroor Aana (2017) and Fukrey Returns. She earned Zee Cine Award for Best Female Playback Singer in 2018. She did her Punjabi debut with song Bajre Da Sitta.

Career
Tangri was a contestant on the Indian reality television show The Voice. She was unplaced in the contest held in 2016. She was also a finalist of Sa Re Ga Ma Pa on Zee TV.

She debuted as a playback singer in Ajay K Pannalal's 2017 romantic comedy film, Behen Hogi Teri through the song, Jai Ma, co-sung by Sahil Solanki. The track was composed by Jaidev Kumar and lyricised by Sonu Saggu. Her second song from the same film, entitled Tenu Na Bol Paavan Main along with Yasser Desai was a critically acclaimed number. Composed by Amjad Nadeem and written by Rohit Sharma, the song was one of the few hit tracks of the album. Next, Tangri sang a special version of Phir Bhi Tumko Chaahunga from Mohit Suri's Half Girlfriend. Composed by Mithoon, originally sung by Arijit Singh and Shraddha Kapoor and written by Manoj Muntashir, the song helped Tangri to establish a musical base in the film industry. She also sang the female version of another song from same film entitled Tu Hi Hai, originally sung by Rahul Mishra.

Tangri's first hit song was Kumaar's Pallo Latke from Vinod Bacchan's film Shaadi Mein Zaroor Aana starring Rajkummar Rao and Kriti Kharbanda composed by Zaim-Saim-Raees. Later in the year, Tangri sang the female version of, Ishq De Fanniyar from Fukrey Returns. In 2018, Jyotica sang Shubh Din from Parmanu: The Story of Pokhran. Composed by Sachin–Jigar and written by Vayu, the song was a critically acclaimed number.

In 2020, Tangri sang three songs for the film Virgin Bhanupriya starring Urvashi Rautela, under the music direction of Chirrantan Bhatt, Ramji Gulati and Amjad Nadeem Aamir.

Filmography

Album(s)

Appearances on television

Awards

References

External links 

Bollywood playback singers
Indian women playback singers
Living people
Zee Cine Awards winners
21st-century Indian singers
21st-century Indian women singers
Year of birth missing (living people)